Hangzhou–Changsha high-speed railway is a China Railway High-speed line connecting Hangzhou, Nanchang, and Changsha, respectively the provincial capitals of Zhejiang, Jiangxi, and Hunan. This railway forms a section of the Shanghai–Kunming high-speed railway, part of the National Railway Grid Network, as one of the four major east-west lines.

Construction started in December 2009 and was opened to traffic on December 10, 2014. With trains from Hangzhou to Nanchang taking 2 hours 14 minutes, Hangzhou to Changsha in three hours and 36 minutes.

Route
The route from east to west starts at Hangzhou East and makes stops at Hangzhou South, Zhuji, Yiwu, Jinhua, Longyou, Quzhou, Jiangshan, Yushan South, Shangrao, Yiyang, Yingtan North, Fuzhou East, Jinxian South, Nanchang West, Gao'an South, Xinyu North, Yichun, Pingxiang North, Liling North, for a total of 21 stations when it reaches Changsha South.

History

Preparation
 In 2004, the State Council, published the "Long-term railway network plan." This proposed for consideration the Hangzhou-Changsha HSR. 
 June 2005 – Hangzhou–Changsha HSR is approved by the State to study routes from Hangzhou, by the way of Nanchang, to Changsha.
 December 6 to 7, 2008 – the Ministry of Railways joins with municipal and county governments along the railway line, a consultative company, Shanghai Railway Bureau, Nanchang Railway Bureau, Guangzhou Railway Group, the Chengdu Railway Bureau, Kunming Railway and other units at a meeting held in Changsha. Examining the Hangzhou-Changsha HSR pre-feasibility study and discussing its construction.
 May 2009 – Hangzhou–Changsha HSR feasibility study is reviewed by the Ministry of Railway.
 June 1, 2009 – Survey work along the route to start.

Construction
 December 2009 – Construction commences.
 April 22, 2013 – Start of electrification construction.

Opening and operation
 September 16, 2014 – Changsha–Nanchang section opens and begins operations
 December 10, 2014 – Hangzhou–Nanchang section opens and begins operations. At the same time there are more classes opened long Shanghai high-speed EMU trains.

Accidents

Construction accident
March 17, 2011 – A tunnel collapsed during construction in Hangzhou's Xiaoshan District, killing two people and leaving one person slightly injured.

References 

High-speed railway lines in China
Rail transport in Hunan
Rail transport in Jiangxi
Rail transport in Zhejiang
Standard gauge railways in China
Railway lines opened in 2014